Hatt is an Old English surname, the name was held by the Anglo-Saxons since before the Saxon invasion and is historically the oldest English surname recorded. Notable people with the surname include:

Richard Hatt, businessman, judge and political figure in Upper Canada
Emilie Demant Hatt (1873–1958), Danish artist
Gudmund Hatt (1884–1960), Danish archaeologist
Eliza Ruth Hatt (died 1892), mistress of William Henry Crossland and mother of his illegitimate son
John Hatt, travel editor of Harper's and Queen, founder in 1982 of Eland Books
Robert T. Hatt, naturalist and author, discoverer of Hatt's vesper rat
Rona Hatt, Canada's first female chemical engineer.

Fictional Characters
Sir Topham Hatt, the Fat Controller of Thomas the Tank Engine

References